This is the list of publishing companies of Estonia. The list is incomplete.

References 

 
Publishing